The Canterbury Tales is a series of six single dramas that originally aired on BBC One in 2003. Each story is an adaptation of one of Geoffrey Chaucer's 14th-century Canterbury Tales. While the stories have been transferred to a modern, 21st century setting, they are still set along the traditional Pilgrims' route to Canterbury.

Repeats of the series in the UK have been on channels including ITV3.

Production
The anthology series was conceived by executive producers Laura Mackie and Franc Roddam in 2001, and produced by Kate Bartlett, while a number of writers and directors were chosen specifically to work on individual episodes.

Bartlett said of the productions that:
I wanted to be as faithful to the stories and spirit of the Tales as possible and we have tried to achieve that. ... They had to appeal to those more familiar with Chaucer but also work in their own right as single films, to an audience unfamiliar with Chaucer, and this was important to all of us.

The production filmed in Kent, at Rochester, which is the setting for "The Pardoner's Tale" and features the castle, Cathedral, Chertsey Gate, the High Street, Esplanade, and various streets, pubs, and restaurants. Gravesend is the setting in "The Sea Captain's Tale", where old waterfront warehouses, the pier, and Town Pier Square feature. The river scenes in "The Man of Law's Tale" were filmed on the River Medway and the Medway Estuary.

Episodes
From Chaucer's original collection, the producers chose six tales:

Awards and nominations
On 29 March 2004, The Wife of Bath was nominated for three awards at the British Academy Television Awards, for Best Single Drama, Best Actress for Julie Walters, and Best Costume Design. Walters went on to win the award.

References

External links
 
 

2000s British drama television series
2003 British television series debuts
2003 British television series endings
BBC television dramas
2000s British television miniseries
2000s British anthology television series
English-language television shows